Alan Gordon may refer to:

Alan Gordon (actor), British actor
Alan Gordon (author) (born 1959), mystery writer whose works are based on Shakespearean characters
Alan Gordon (Brookside), fictional character from the defunct soap opera Brookside
Alan Gordon (historian) (born 1968), Scottish-born Canadian historian
Alan Gordon (Scottish footballer) (1944–2010), Scottish footballer
Alan Gordon (soccer) (born 1981), American soccer player
Alan Gordon (songwriter) (1944–2008), American songwriter
Alan Gordon (cricketer) (1944–2007), English cricketer
Al Gordon (born 1953), comic book artist
Lin Gordon (1917–2011), Australian politician

See also
Allan Gordon, protagonist of The Surpassing Adventures of Allan Gordon by James Hogg

Gordon P. Allen (1929–2010), U.S. Democratic politician